Parnell Township is a township in Polk County, Minnesota, United States. It is part of the Grand Forks-ND-MN Metropolitan Statistical Area. The population was 87 at the 2000 census.

Parnell Township was named for Charles Stewart Parnell (1846–1891), an Irish politician.

Geography
According to the United States Census Bureau, the township has a total area of 36.3 square miles (94.0 km), all land.

Demographics
At the 2000 census there were 87 people in 31 households, including 23 families, in the township. The population density was 2.4 people per square mile (0.9/km). There were 31 housing units at an average density of 0.9/sq mi (0.3/km).  The racial makeup of the township was 100.00% White. Hispanic or Latino of any race were 1.15%.

Of the 31 households, 48.4% had children under the age of 18 living with them, 74.2% were married couples living together, 3.2% had a female householder with no husband present, and 22.6% were non-families. 22.6% of households were one person, and 12.9% were one person aged 65 or older. The average household size was 2.81 and the average family size was 3.33.

In the township the population was spread out, with 33.3% under the age of 18, 6.9% from 18 to 24, 26.4% from 25 to 44, 21.8% from 45 to 64, and 11.5% 65 or older. The median age was 36 years. For every 100 females, there were 81.3 males. For every 100 females age 18 and over, there were 107.1 males.

The median income for a household in the township was $45,000, and the median family income was $65,625. Males had a median income of $36,250 versus $9,375 for females. The per capita income for the township was $22,360. There were no families and 4.0% of the population living below the poverty line, including no under eighteens and none of those over 64.

References

Townships in Polk County, Minnesota
Townships in Minnesota